Hathersage F.C. is an English association football club from Hathersage, Derbyshire. They play in the Hope Valley Amateur League.

History
They entered the FA Amateur Cup in 1908, from 1912 to 1922 and from 1928 to 1929. and won the Sheffield Amateur League in 1907 and 1920.

References

Sheffield Amateur League
Football clubs in Derbyshire
Football clubs in England
Hope Valley Amateur League